Olga Richterová (born 21 January 1985) is a Czech linguist and politician. She was the vice-chairwoman of the Czech Pirate Party from January 2018 to January 2022 and is a member of the Chamber of Deputies of the Czech Republic since the 2017 legislative election. Richterová was re-elected in the October 2021 Czech legislative election on a joint list of the Pirates and Mayors electoral alliance and became a vice-president of the Chamber of Deputies.

Life and career
Richterová was born on 21 January 1985 in České Budějovice in southern Bohemia and grew up in Choltice in the Pardubice Region. She studied linguistics, English and German translation at the Faculty of Arts, Charles University in Prague. Richterová joined the Czech Pirate Party in 2014 and has been a council member of Prague 10 district in 2014 to 2018 prior to being elected Deputy of the Parliament of the Czech Republic in the 2017 legislative election. Her political agenda has been housing legislation, social policy and urban planning policy. She serves as the vice-chairwoman of the parliamentary Committee on Social Policy from 19 December 2017.

She was elected vice-chairwoman of the party in January 2018. In January 2020, she was re-elected as party vice-chairwoman. Richterová led the Pirates and Mayors electoral alliance in the Prague region in the October 2021 Czech legislative election and was re-elected. Subsequently, she became a vice-president of the Chamber of Deputies.

Personal life
Richterová is a member of the Evangelical Church of Czech Brethren, is married and has two children.

References

External links
 
 Olga Richterová on Czech Pirate Party website

1985 births
21st-century Czech women politicians
Czech Pirate Party MPs
Living people
Charles University alumni
Members of the Chamber of Deputies of the Czech Republic (2017–2021)
Linguists from the Czech Republic
Women linguists
Czech translators
Czech Protestants
Members of the Chamber of Deputies of the Czech Republic (2021–2025)